In mathematics, specifically in real analysis, the Bolzano–Weierstrass theorem, named after Bernard Bolzano and Karl Weierstrass, is a fundamental result about convergence in a finite-dimensional Euclidean space . The theorem states that each infinite bounded sequence in  has a convergent subsequence. The theorem is sometimes called the sequential compactness theorem.

History and significance

The Bolzano–Weierstrass theorem is named after mathematicians Bernard Bolzano and Karl Weierstrass.  It was actually first proved by Bolzano in 1817 as a lemma in the proof of the intermediate value theorem.  Some fifty years later the result was identified as significant in its own right, and proved again by Weierstrass. It has since become an essential theorem of analysis.

Proof 

Indeed, we have the following result:

Lemma: Every infinite sequence  in  has a monotone subsequence.

Proof: Let us call a positive integer-valued index  of a sequence a "peak" of the sequence when  for every . Suppose first that the sequence has infinitely many peaks, which means there is a subsequence with the following indices  and the following terms . Repeating this process leads to an infinite non-decreasing  subsequence  , thereby proving that every infinite sequence  in  has a monotone subsequence.

It follows from the monotone convergence theorem that this subsequence converges.

One can then extract a sub-subsequence on which the second coordinates converge, and so on, until in the end we have passed from the original sequence to a subsequence  times—which is still a subsequence of the original sequence—on which each coordinate sequence converges, hence the subsequence itself is convergent.

Alternative proof 
There is also an alternative proof of the Bolzano–Weierstrass theorem using nested intervals. We start with a bounded sequence :

Because we halve the length of an interval at each step, the limit of the interval's length is zero. Also, by the nested intervals theorem, which states that if each  is a closed and bounded interval, say

 

with

 

Thus there is a number  that is in each interval .

Sequential compactness in Euclidean spaces 

Theorem:   is sequentially compact if and only if  is closed and bounded.

Proof: (sequential compactness implies closed and bounded)

Then  must be bounded, since otherwise the following unbounded sequence  can be constructed. For every , define  to be any arbitrary point such that .

Proof: (closed and bounded implies sequential compactness)

Since  is bounded, any sequence  is also bounded. From the Bolzano-Weierstrass theorem,  contains a subsequence converging to some point .

In fact, general topology tells us that a metrizable space is compact if and only if it is sequentially compact, so that the Bolzano–Weierstrass and Heine–Borel theorems are essentially the same.

Application to economics 
There are different important equilibrium concepts in economics, the proofs of the existence of which often require variations of the Bolzano–Weierstrass theorem. One example is the existence of a Pareto efficient allocation. An allocation is a matrix of consumption bundles for agents in an economy, and an allocation is Pareto efficient if no change can be made to it that makes no agent worse off and at least one agent better off (here rows of the allocation matrix must be rankable by a preference relation). The Bolzano–Weierstrass theorem allows one to prove that if the set of allocations is compact and non-empty, then the system has a Pareto-efficient allocation.

See also
Sequentially compact space
Heine–Borel theorem
Completeness of the real numbers
Ekeland's variational principle

Notes

References

External links
 
 A proof of the Bolzano–Weierstrass theorem
 PlanetMath: proof of Bolzano–Weierstrass Theorem
 The Bolzano-Weierstrass Rap

Theorems in real analysis
Compactness theorems